Partisan film is the name for a subgenre of war films made in FPR/SFR Yugoslavia during the 1960s, 1970s and 1980s. In the broadest sense, main characteristics of Partisan films are that they are set in Yugoslavia during World War II and have Yugoslav Partisans as main protagonists, while the antagonists are Axis forces and their collaborators. According to Croatian film historian Ivo Škrabalo, Partisan film is "one of the most authentic genres that emerged from the Yugoslav cinema".

Definition and scope
There are disagreements, even among the film critics, about the exact definition of the genre. Partisan films are often equated solely with the populist, entertainment-oriented branch of the genre, characterized by epic scope, ensemble casts, expensive production, and emotionally intense scenes, all introduced into Yugoslav war films by Veljko Bulajić's Kozara (1962). The other branchmuch less interesting to the Communist establishmentwas represented by modernist films, ranging from the poetic naturalism of the Yugoslav Black Wave to experimental stream-of-consciousness films.

In his analysis of Fadil Hadžić's The Raid on Drvar (1963), Croatian film critic Jurica Pavičić identifies seven key characteristics of what he calls "super-Partisan films":
 Focus on crucial, well-known, "textbook" examples of Partisan struggle, such as major battles and operations, which are then given an officially sanctioned interpretation.
 Absence of authentic, high-profile figures of Partisan struggle, with the exception of Josip Broz Tito. In Pavičić's view, the rationale for this was to avoid threatening Tito's cult of personality.
 Mosaic structure in which sometimes dozens of characters take part, and their fate is followed throughout the film. These characters represent different classes or walks of life (intellectuals, peasants), or different ethnicities.
 Mixing of the comic with the tragic.
 The presence of foreign (non-Yugoslav) characters as arbiters. Their role is to witness and verify the martyrdom and heroism of Yugoslav peoples as Partisan films depict them, sending a symbolical message ("There it is, the world acknowledges us as we are").
 The characteristic treatment of the Germans: although they are portrayed as villains, and are demonized in various ways, they are also shown to be superior in power and discipline, and are depicted as an efficient, sophisticated, even glamorous adversary.
 Deus ex machina endings, in which the Partisans break out of seemingly hopeless situations.
Pavičić's analysis was criticized for not being universally applicable to Partisan films, and a number of notable exceptions to the above formula were provided.

By the 1980s, economic hardship in the country, as well as change in the ideological landscape, particularly with the younger Yugoslav generation, caused a waning of interest in the genre, and the critical and commercial failure of Bulajić's Great Transport (1983) is usually seen as a symbolic end of the Partisan film era.

Notable films

Kozara (1962, directed by Veljko Bulajić)
The Raid on Drvar (1963, directed by Fadil Hadžić)
Nikoletina Bursać (1964, directed by Branko Bauer)
The Secret Invasion (1964, directed by Roger Corman)
Eagles Fly Early (1966, directed by Soja Jovanović)
The Demolition Squad (Diverzanti) (1967, directed by Hajrudin Krvavac)
Operation Belgrade (1968, directed by Žika Mitrović)
Bomb at 10:10 (1967, directed by 	Caslav Damjanovic)
Battle of Neretva (1969, directed by Veljko Bulajić, nominated for Oscar) - starring Yul Brynner
The Bridge (Most) (1969, directed by Hajrudin Krvavac)
When You Hear the Bells (1969, directed by Antun Vrdoljak)
The Pine Tree in the Mountain (1971, directed by Antun Vrdoljak)
Walter Defends Sarajevo (1972, directed by Hajrudin Krvavac)
The Battle of Sutjeska (1973, directed by Stipe Delić) - starring Richard Burton
Bombaši (1973, directed by Predrag Golubović)
Guns of War (1974, directed by Žika Mitrović)
Hell River (1974, directed by Stole Jankovic) - starring Rod Taylor and Adam West
Crveni udar (1974, directed by Predrag Golubović)
Doktor Mladen (1975, directed by Midhat Mutapdžić)
The Peaks of Zelengora (1976, directed by Zdravko Velimirović)
Maiden Bridge (1976, directed by Miomir Stamenković)
Battle for South Railway (1978, directed by Zdravko Velimirović)
Force 10 from Navarone (1978, directed by Guy Hamilton)
Boško Buha (1978, directed by Branko Bauer)
The Partisan Squadron or Battle of Eagles (1979, directed by Hajrudin Krvavac)
13th of July (1982, directed by Radomir Saranović)
Great Transport (1983, directed by Veljko Bulajić)
The Igman March (1983, directed by Zdravko Šotra)

Notable television series
 Otpisani

References

Sources
Jugoslavenski špageti-vesterni: propaganda i nostalgija 
Partizanski film je naša kulturna baština 
Partizanski film i strip...ili priča o sađenju limuna u Sibiru

Further reading
 
 Miranda Jakiša i Nikica Gilić: Partizanska umjetnost samooslobođenja 
 Nikica Gilić: Hrvatski film je raskinuo s partizanskim

See also
War film
Cinema of Europe

Films about anti-fascism
Cinema of Yugoslavia
 
Lists of World War II films
Yugoslavia in fiction
1960s in film
1970s in film
1980s in film